St Aidan's High School (simply referred to as St Aidan's) is an 11–18 mixed, Roman Catholic, secondary school in Wishaw, North Lanarkshire, Scotland. It is located in the Roman Catholic Diocese of Motherwell.

It was rated 'good' by Education Scotland following its inspection in December 2018, and was ranked 139th out of 339 secondary schools in Scotland for exam results in 2019.

Notable alumni 

 John Higgins, snooker player
 Joe Jordan, footballer
 Nicholas McDonald, singer
 Geraldine McKelvie, journalist
 Stephen O'Donnell, footballer

References

External links 
 

Catholic secondary schools in North Lanarkshire
Wishaw